Winston Smith is a fictional character and the main protagonist of George Orwell's dystopian 1949 novel Nineteen Eighty-Four. The character was employed by Orwell as an everyman in the setting of the novel, a "central eye ... [the reader] can readily identify with."

Character overview

Winston Smith works in the Records Department of the Ministry of Truth, where his job is to rewrite historical documents so they match the constantly changing current party line. This involves revising newspaper articles and doctoring photographs—mostly to remove "unpersons", people who have fallen afoul of the party. Because of his proximity to the mechanics of rewriting history, Winston Smith nurses doubts about the Party and its monopoly on truth. Whenever Winston appears in front of a telescreen, he is referred to as "6079 Smith W".

Winston meets a mysterious woman named Julia, a fellow member of the Outer Party who also bears resentment toward the party's ways; the two become lovers. Winston soon gets in touch with O'Brien, a member of the Inner Party who Winston believes is secretly a member of The Brotherhood, a resistance organisation dedicated to overthrowing the Party's dictatorship. Believing they have met a kindred spirit, Winston and Julia meet him privately and are given a book written by Emmanuel Goldstein - the leader of the Brotherhood and principal enemy of the state of Oceania - under the requirement that only after they have read it will they be full members of the Brotherhood.

However, O'Brien is really an agent of the Thought Police, which has had Winston under surveillance for seven years. Winston and Julia are soon captured. Winston remains defiant when he is captured, and endures several months of extreme torture at O'Brien's hands. However, his spirit finally breaks when he is taken into Room 101 and confronted by his worst fear: the unspeakable horror of slowly being eaten alive by rats. Terrified by the realization that this threat will come true if he continues to resist, he denounces Julia and pledges his loyalty to the Party. Any possibility of resistance or independent thought is destroyed when Smith is forced to accept the assertion 2 + 2 = 5, a phrase which has entered the lexicon to represent obedience to ideology over rational truth or fact. By the end of the novel, O'Brien's torture has reverted Winston to an obedient, unquestioning party member who genuinely loves "Big Brother". Beyond his total capitulation and submission to the party, Winston's fate is left unresolved in the novel. As Winston realises that he loves Big Brother, he dreams of a public trial and an execution; however the novel itself ends with Winston, still in the Chestnut Tree Café, contemplating and adoring the face of Big Brother.

Personality
Winston is stated as being 39 years old at the beginning of the book. Like other major characters, he is a smoker and drinker (his gin and tobacco are of the low-quality "Victory" brand available to Outer Party members). It is mentioned that he has a wife, Katherine, from whom he has become estranged. Winston also has a varicose ulcer on the back of his leg, a point repeatedly touched upon seemingly to exacerbate the sense of the poverty in which he lives.

Winston seems to have a curious and intellectual nature (which ultimately puts him in the Party's sights). He has an affection for and interest in items and poetry from the past. Even before he begins an affair with Julia, he develops a rapport with the seemingly harmless Mr Charrington, who sells him a diary and a distinctive coral ornament. He also introduces Winston to the largely forgotten rhyme "Oranges and Lemons", prompting him to look for similarly lost poetry.

Conception
Winston is described as a Londoner in the novel. His name is usually taken to come from Winston Churchill and the common surname Smith. He was also partly inspired by the character of Rubashov from Arthur Koestler's novel Darkness at Noon, especially his response and reaction to his interrogation.

In other media
The character of Smith has appeared on radio, television and film in adaptations of the novel
 The first actor to play the role was David Niven in a 27 August 1949 radio adaptation for NBC's NBC University Theater
 Richard Widmark played Smith on a 26 April 1953 broadcast of The United States Steel Hour on ABC radio.
 In the 21 September 1953 episode of Studio One, Smith was played by Eddie Albert.
 In BBC One's Nineteen Eighty-Four (1954) Smith was played by Peter Cushing.
 Vincent Price played Smith in a 1955 Australian Lux Radio Theatre adaptation.
 In the 1956 film. Smith was played by Edmond O'Brien.
 In a 1965 dramatisation broadcast on BBC Home Service, Patrick Troughton voiced the part.
 Gary Watson played the role in a three-part 1967 BBC Radio 4 adaptation.
 John Hurt played Smith in the 1984 film adaptation, 1984.
 Christopher Eccleston played the role in a two-part 2013 BBC Radio 3 dramatization.

References

External links

NBC University Theater recording of 1984

Fictional activists
Fictional alcohol abusers
Fictional civil servants
Fictional diarists
Fictional people from London
Fictional revolutionaries
Literary characters introduced in 1949
Male characters in literature
Nineteen Eighty-Four characters
Orphan characters in film
Orphan characters in literature

de:1984 (Roman)#Winston Smith
fi:Winston Smith